Hlboké is a lake in Slovakia. It is noted for its windsurfing.

References

Lakes of Slovakia